Tadeusz Schmidt (14 November 1920 – 10 May 1976) was a Polish film actor. He appeared in more than 40 films between 1942 and 1976.

Selected filmography
 The Two Who Stole the Moon (1962)
 Potem nastąpi cisza (1965)
 Westerplatte (1967)
 Stawka większa niż życie (1967)
 Colonel Wolodyjowski (1969)
 Boleslaw Smialy (1972)

References

External links

1920 births
1976 deaths
Polish male film actors
Polish male stage actors
Male actors from Kraków
20th-century Polish male actors